Simon Robert Porter (9 August 1950 – 9 February 2017) was an English cricketer. Porter was a right-handed batsman who bowled right-arm off break. He was born in Cowley, Oxfordshire.

Oxford University
Simon Porter attended Peers School, Littlemore, before going up to St Edmund Hall, Oxford. He made his first-class debut for Oxford University against Worcestershire in 1973. He played 6 further first-class matches for the University, the last coming against Cambridge University in the same year. In his 7 first-class matches, he scored 76 runs at a batting average of 7.60, with a high score of 20. With the ball, he took 18 wickets at a bowling average of 33.33, with best figures of 4/26.

It was Oxford University that he made his debut in List A cricket for, against Warwickshire in the 1973 Benson & Hedges Cup. He made 2 further appearances for the University in that season's competition, against Northamptonshire and Worcestershire.

Oxfordshire
Porter made his debut for Oxfordshire before playing for Oxford University, first appearing in the 1971 Minor Counties Championship against Wiltshire. Porter played Minor counties cricket for Oxfordshire from 1971 to 1988 which included 118 Minor Counties Championship matches and 9 MCCA Knockout Trophy matches. He played his first List A match for Oxfordshire against Cornwall in the 1975 Gillette Cup. He played 7 further List A matches for Oxfordshire, the last of which came against Leicestershire in the 1987 NatWest Trophy. In his 8 List A matches for the county, he scored 55 runs at an average of 9.16, with a high score of 44. He took 9 wickets at a bowling average of 45.33, with best figures of 3/58.

References

External links
Simon Porter at ESPNcricinfo
Simon Porter at CricketArchive

1950 births
2017 deaths
Cricketers from Oxford
Alumni of St Edmund Hall, Oxford
English cricketers
Oxfordshire cricketers
Oxford University cricketers